is a single by Japanese duo Spontania featuring singer Yuna Ito. It was released on January 28, 2009.

Promotion
Promotion started at a Christmas event, where the trio performed the single. To further promote the single, Spontania and Ito performed the single on three music shows, NHK Music Japan, NTV Music Fighter and Music Fair.

Track list
 "Ima Demo Zutto"
 "My Life"
 "Ima Demo Zutto" (Instrumental)
 "My Life" (Instrumental)

Charts

Billboard Japan chart

Oricon

References

2009 singles
2009 songs